James Maurice Stockford Careless  (February 17, 1919 – April 6, 2009) was a Canadian historian.

Biography

J.M.S. Careless was born in Toronto, Ontario and attended the University of Toronto Schools. He received a Bachelor of Arts degree in 1940 from Trinity College at the University of Toronto. He attended Harvard University and received a Master's degree in 1941 and a PhD in 1950.

During the Second World War, he worked in the historical branch of Naval Service Headquarters at Ottawa, then transferred to the Department of External Affairs, where he served as Canadian Diplomatic Officer aboard the exchange ship .

Careless began lecturing at the University of Toronto in 1945, where he taught graduate and undergraduate courses in Canadian political, ethnic, urban and intellectual history.
He was appointed Assistant Professor in 1949, became a full Professor in 1959 and served as Chairman of the Department of History from 1959 to 1967. Dr. Careless was President of the Ontario Historical Society in 1959 and served as Vice-Chairman of the provincial Archaeological and Historic Sites Board. He was made Professor Emeritus in 1984.

In 1962, he was made a Fellow of the Royal Society of Canada and was awarded the J.B. Tyrrell Historical Medal. From 1963 to 1973, he was a Trustee for the Ontario Science Centre. From 1975 to 1981, he was a Director of the Ontario Heritage Foundation.

In 1981, he was made an Officer of the Order of Canada for his "ability to interpret Canadian history to the general reading public".  In 1987, he was awarded the Order of Ontario.

Private life
J. M. S. Careless married Elizabeth Isobel Robinson on December 31, 1940. The couple had 5 children and 10 grandchildren.

Awards and honours

Awards
 Governor General's Award, 1953, 1963
 University of British Columbia Medal for Biography, 1960
 J.B. Tyrrell Historical Medal, 1962
 Royal Society of Canada Fellow, 1962
 Cruikshank Medal, Ontario Historical Society, 1967
 City of Toronto Award, 1984, 1985
 Order of Canada, 1981
 Order of Ontario, 1987
 National Heritage Award, 1987

Honorary degrees
 Laurentian University, 1979
 Memorial University, 1981
 University of Victoria, 1982
 Royal Roads University, 1983
 McMaster University, 1983
 University of New Brunswick, 1984
 University of Calgary, 1986

Selected bibliography
 Canada: A Story of Challenge (1953), winner of the 1953 Governor General's Awards
 The Union of the Canadas (1967)
 Brown of the Globe Volume 1 (1959) and Volume 2 (1963), winner of the 1963 Governor General's Awards
 Rise of Cities in Canada (1978)
 The Pre-Confederation Premiers: Ontario Government Leaders, 1841-1867 (1980)
 Toronto to 1918: An Illustrated History (1984), winner of the City of Toronto Book Award
 Frontier and Metropolis (1989)  
 Careless at Work: Selected Canadian Historical Studies (1990)
 Ontario, A Celebration of Heritage (2 volumes 1991, 1992)
 Canada, A Celebration of Heritage (2 volumes 1994, 1995)

Historical Consultant
J.M.S. Careless has served as a historical consultant for many films and television shows, including:

 Lord Elgin: Voice of the People, 1959
 Charles Tupper: The Big Man, 1961
 John A. Macdonald: The Impossible Idea, 1961
 Joseph Howe: The Tribune of Nova Scotia, 1961
 Lord Durham, 1961
 Robert Baldwin: A Matter of Principle, 1961
 William Lyon Mackenzie: A Friend to His Country, 1961
 Alexander Galt: The Stubborn Idealist, 1962
 Louis-Hippolyte Lafontaine, 1962
 John Cabot: A Man of the Renaissance, 1964
 The Last Voyage of Henry Hudson, 1964
 Selkirk of Red River, 1964
 David Thompson: The Great Mapmaker, 1964
 Alexander Mackenzie: The Lord of the North, 1964
 Origins: A History of Canada, TV series, 1987

Notes

References

External links
 
J.M.S. Careless archival papers held at the University of Toronto Archives and Records Management Services

1919 births
2009 deaths
Canadian Anglicans
Canadian male non-fiction writers
Fellows of the Royal Society of Canada
Harvard University alumni
Officers of the Order of Canada
Members of the Order of Ontario
Writers from Toronto
University of Toronto alumni
Academic staff of the University of Toronto
Governor General's Award-winning non-fiction writers
Historians of Canada
20th-century Canadian historians
Presidents of the Canadian Historical Association